Stuart Timmons (January 14, 1957 – January 28, 2017) was an American journalist, activist, historian, and award-winning author specializing in LGBT history based in Los Angeles, California. He was the author of The Trouble With Harry Hay: Founder of the Modern Gay Movement and the co-author of Gay L.A.: A History of Sexual Outlaws, Power Politics, and Lipstick Lesbians with Lillian Faderman.

Early life
Timmons was born on January 14, 1957, in Cottagewood Hospital in Minneapolis, Minnesota. He has two sisters, Gay and Emily Timmons, both in the SF Bay Area. While he was still a toddler, his family moved to Santa Barbara due to his father getting a new job.

Timmons received his Bachelor of Arts in film from the University of California, Los Angeles (UCLA). While he was a student at UCLA, he co-founded the gay festival on campus with John Ramirez in 1979; it later became known as Outfest.

Career 
Through his career Timmons wrote and edited for magazines, documentary  films and non-fiction literature. While at UCLA, where he majored in film, his work as an activist impressed Mark Thompson, who was then the senior editor of The Advocate, a national gay and lesbian news magazine. Thompson hired Timmons as a journalist for the magazine.

Timmons was the author of The Trouble With Harry Hay: Founder of the Modern Gay Movement, published in 1990. With lesbian historian Lillian Faderman, he co-authored Gay L.A.: A History of Sexual Outlaws, Power Politics, And Lipstick Lesbians, published in 2006. It chronicles the history of gays and lesbians in Los Angeles since the late 1700s.

Timmons served as the executive director of the ONE National Gay & Lesbian Archives and served on its board of directors. In 2007, he began developing walking tours of LGBTQ historic sites in Los Angeles. He finished tours of Downtown Los Angeles and Silver Lake, Los Angeles, but experienced a severe cerebellar stroke in January 2008 before he could complete his West Hollywood edition.

With a grant from the City of West Hollywood, Los Angeles-based performance artist Jason Jenn helped Timmons complete and produce the City of West Hollywood LGBTQ History Tour in celebration of the city's 30th Anniversary in 2015. The walking tour was also adapted into a self-guided mobile app. The walking tour included live performances of historical information including the talents of comedian Kristina Wong, and Justin Sayer (a writer for 2 Broke Girls and stand-up comedian).  He was a co-organizer of the dedication of the Mattachine Steps in Silver Lake named for the Mattachine Society on April 7, 2012, alongside Mark Thompson, Wes Joe, Mitch O'Farrell, and Eric Garcetti (then a councilor and present-day mayor of Los Angeles).

Timmons received a nomination for gay non-fiction from the American Library Association for his first book in 1990. For his book with Faderman, he received the Monette-Horwitz Award for LGBT Scholarship, the Lambda Literary Award, LGBT Non-Fiction and the Lambda Literary Award, LGBT Arts and Culture in 2007.

Later life and death
Timmons was openly gay. He suffered a stroke in 2008 which greatly diminished his cognitive function. Timmons died on January 28, 2017, at the Serrano North Convalescent Hospital in Hollywood, California, from cardiac arrest, at the age of 60. An intimate memorial was held at ONE National Gay & Lesbian Archives.

Bibliography

Filmography

Hope Along the Wind: The Story of Harry Hay – co-writer and historical consultant.

References

External links 
Official website of Stuart Timmons

1957 births
2017 deaths
Writers from Minneapolis
University of California, Los Angeles alumni
American LGBT rights activists
20th-century American historians
American male non-fiction writers
21st-century American historians
21st-century American male writers
American gay writers
LGBT people from Minnesota
American non-fiction writers
LGBT people from California
Writers from California
Radical Faeries members
20th-century American male writers